Kjellson is a surname. Notable people with the surname include:

Grutle Kjellson (born 1973), Norwegian vocalist and bass player for the progressive Viking metal band Enslaved
Ingvar Kjellson (1923–2014), Swedish stage and film actor

Surnames of Scandinavian origin